Thomas J. Harvey (born August 23, 1982) is a Canadian Liberal politician who represented the riding of Tobique—Mactaquac in the House of Commons of Canada from 2015 to 2019.

On February 19, 2019, Harvey announced that he would not run in the 2019 Canadian federal election, and spoke about his “desire to return to work in the private sector.”

Electoral record

References

External links
 
 Official Website

Living people
Members of the House of Commons of Canada from New Brunswick
Liberal Party of Canada MPs
Canadian farmers
Nova Scotia Agricultural College alumni
21st-century Canadian politicians
1982 births